Jo Budd (fl. 1980 -) is an English artist specialising in creating art from textiles. Trained as a Fine Artist her work could be described as Quilt Art, but frequently contains both collage and/or printing.

Biography
Josephine Budd was born in 1961 in Norwich. She completed her Fine Art education in Newcastle University and began a career in teaching as well as practising her art. She is known for her art work using quilts, collage and printing.

Budd has tackled a number of commissions for notable companies and her work is in a number of collections including the Victoria and Albert Museum, Budd's use of landscape in her work led Edexcel to recommend her as an artist for British Art and Design GCSE students to study in 2010.

Budd lives near the Norfolk and Suffolk border with her partner, Brian Excell. She has one son.

Work
 Winter/Male – Hanging – 320 x 179 cm
 Summer/Female – Sewn collage – 170 x 314 cm

References

British textile artists
Quilters
Living people
Artists from Norwich
Women textile artists
Year of birth missing (living people)